Jean-Charles Sénac (born 23 May 1985 in Chambéry) is a French road bicycle racer.

Professional Team
He rode for UCI ProTour team .

Palmares

2006
 1st, Overall, Tour des Pays de Savoie
 Winner Stage 4
2007
 2nd, National Amateur Road Race Championship

External links

French male cyclists
1985 births
Sportspeople from Chambéry
Living people
Cyclists from Auvergne-Rhône-Alpes